Allaeanthus is a genus of flowering plants belonging to the family Moraceae.

Its native range is Madagascar, Comoros, Nepal to Indo-China, Central Malesia.

Species:

Allaeanthus greveanus 
Allaeanthus kurzii 
Allaeanthus luzonicus 
Allaeanthus zeylanicus

References

Moraceae
Moraceae genera